Ibrahima Sory Conté (born 3 April 1991) is a Guinean professional footballer who plays as a midfielder for Liga Leumit club Maccabi Jaffa.

Career
Conté comes from the youth section of Fello Star. He played his first games in Belgium in the youth division of K.A.A. Gent. His first game was in the 2009–10 season. He played for the team of Gent against KVC Westerlo as a substitute. In the 2010–11 season, he was definitely part of the A-team.

Conté joined KV Oostende in the end of August 2016. In January 2017, he was loaned out to Waasland-Beveren. Conté left KV Oostende on 5 March 2019.

Conté made his debut for Guinea on 17 November 2010, coming on as a substitute in the 1:2 loss against Burkina Faso in a friendly match.

Career statistics

Club

International goals

Scores and results list Guinea's goal tally first, score column indicates score after each Conté goal.

Notes

External links
 
 

1991 births
Living people
Susu people
Sportspeople from Conakry
Guinean footballers
Association football wingers
Association football midfielders
Guinea international footballers
K.A.A. Gent players
S.V. Zulte Waregem players
R.S.C. Anderlecht players
K.V. Oostende players
S.K. Beveren players
PFC Beroe Stara Zagora players
Bnei Sakhnin F.C. players
Maccabi Jaffa F.C. players
Belgian Pro League players
Israeli Premier League players
Liga Leumit players
Guinean expatriate footballers
Expatriate footballers in Belgium
Expatriate footballers in Bulgaria
Expatriate footballers in Israel
Guinean expatriate sportspeople in Belgium
Guinean expatriate sportspeople in Bulgaria
Guinean expatriate sportspeople in Israel
2012 Africa Cup of Nations players
2015 Africa Cup of Nations players
2021 Africa Cup of Nations players